Aoibheann Clancy (born 31 October 2003) is an Irish footballer who plays as a midfielder for Wexford Youths of the Women's National League (WNL) and the Republic of Ireland women's national team.

Club career
Clancy is from Kilbehenny in County Limerick. At youth level she played ladies' Gaelic football for Galtee Gaels, and Camogie for St. Fanahan's. In youth soccer she was active in the Tipperary Schoolboys/girls Southern & District League (TSSDL) for both Kilburn Celtic and Tipperary Town, before she joined the youth system of local Women's National League club Limerick WFC.

Wexford Youths
Ahead of the delayed 2020 Women's National League season, Clancy joined Wexford Youths. In September 2020 she made her first start for her new club as Wexford inflicted a first defeat of the season on champions Peamount United. Impressed Wexford coach Tom Elmes declared Clancy "one of the stand-out performances".

Clancy's strong form continued into the 2021 Women's National League season. She was "instrumental" in the 2021 FAI Women's Cup Final, as Wexford Youths defeated Shelbourne 3–1. At the 2021 WNL Awards she was named in the Team of the Season and beat fellow nominees Ellen Molloy and Jessie Stapleton to the Young Player of the Year.

International career

Youth

Clancy represented Ireland at schoolgirl level while she attended Presentation School, Thurles. She was named Player of the Match as Ireland beat England in the final of the 2017 John Read Cup. She was also vice-captain in the team which retained the trophy the following year.

She progressed to the Republic of Ireland women's national under-17 football team, and by 2021 was playing for Dave Connell's Republic of Ireland women's national under-19 football team. She made a single appearance during the calendar year.

Senior

Clancy's first senior call-up was for a friendly game against Australia on 21 September 2021 at Tallaght Stadium. The national team coach Vera Pauw had been impressed by her good form with her club and in home-based training sessions. Clancy won her first senior cap on 14 November 2022, as a 62nd-minute substitute for Denise O'Sullivan in a 4–0 friendly win over Morocco staged in Marbella, Spain.

Playing style
Clancy is a versatile box-to-box midfielder, whose "quick feet and awareness allow her to operate superbly between the lines".

Personal life
In 2022 Clancy began studying biomedical sciences at University College Dublin.

References

External links
 

2003 births
Living people
Republic of Ireland women's association footballers
Republic of Ireland women's international footballers
Women's association football midfielders
Wexford Youths W.F.C. players
Association footballers from County Limerick
Republic of Ireland women's youth international footballers
Limerick W.F.C. players
People associated with University College Dublin
Galtee Gaels Gaelic footballers